The World's Most Beautiful Transsexual Contest is a beauty pageant that was held in Las Vegas in 2004 that selected the "most beautiful" transsexual in the world.

Jahna Steele was the mistress of ceremonies for the pageant, in which 35 trans women competed. Contestants were required to provide proof of their original sex, and both pre-operation (pre-op) and post-operation (post-op) trans women were allowed to enter the contest.

The pageant featured four competition stages:
 swimwear
 evening gown
 talent competitions
 interviews

Entertainment Tonight and The Howard Stern Show were among the many media organizations that covered the pageant, which was also made into a documentary entitled Trantasia which aired on Showtime.  Three of the contestants featured in the pageant and documentary later reunited to appear in their own reality television series Wild Things.

The 2004 winner was Chicago showgirl Mimi Marks, who had won the "Miss Continental Pageant" in 1992. Erica Andrews (Miss Continental 2004) was the first runner-up and Lucie Marie Pereyra was the second runner-up  In addition, both Mimi and Erica have won the "Miss International Queen" contest in Pattaya, Thailand; Marks in 2005, Andrews in 2006.

Other category winners included:

 Erica Andrews, "Best Talent"
 Lucy Marie Pereyra, "Best Swimsuit"
 Tara Willow Desy, "Miss Congeniality"

Original 2004 Contestants

 Alecia Cienega
 Cézanne
 Cassandra Cass
 CoCo Van Cartier
 Delilah Paris
 Dorae Saunders
 Erica Andrews
 Ireen Sue
 Jurnee Abigail
 Kayla
 Kristina Marie
 Lana Blake
 Maria Roman
 Marie
 Mimi Marks
 Milissa Ravin
 Montana Navarre
 Nicole Xtravaganza aka Nikki Exotika
 Ruby Bella Cruz
 Sonovia
 Susan B. Whitney
 Tamalah Taylor
 Tara Willow Deasy
 Tiara Russell
 Tiffany Pagie
 Venus Envy
 Vi
 Victoria 'Porkchop' Parker

Other transsexual pageants

 The Amazing Philippines Beauty Contest is another annual pageant that is strictly opened to transsexuals, transvestites, and other transgender competitors. Held in Manila, the 2006 winner was Maria Romano Monte Carlo, who defeated 27 rivals for the crown. She went on to compete in the Miss International Queen pageant in Thailand in 2007.

References

External links
Trantasia official website
Trantasia on the Internet Movie Database

Transgender beauty pageants
LGBT events in the United States
Transgender in the United States